Austis is a comune (municipality) in the Province of Nuoro in the Italian region Sardinia, located about  north of Cagliari and about  southwest of Nuoro.

Austis borders the following municipalities: Neoneli, Nughedu Santa Vittoria, Olzai, Ortueri, Sorgono, Teti, Tiana.

References

External links

 Official website

Cities and towns in Sardinia